A list of films produced by the Hindi film industry based in Bombay in 1931:

1931
1931 was a ground-breaking year for Indian cinema. The first Hindi Talkie Alam Ara was released on 14 March 1931 in Mumbai's Majestic Cinema. The film was produced by Imperial Movietone and directed by Ardeshir Irani. It starred Master Vithal, Zubeida, Prithviraj Kapoor and Wazir Mohammed Khan. The first song to be sung in films was by Wazir Mohammed Khan for Alam Ara, "De De Khuda Ke Naam Par" under the music direction of Firozeshah Mistry.

This year saw the release of 207 silent films from all over India and 28 Talkies. Out of the 28 talkies 23 were in Hindi, 3 in Bengali, one in Tamil, and one in Telugu. The first Bengali film was Jamai Shashthi by Madan Theatres Calcutta. The first Tamil film was Kalidas produced by Imperial Movietone and the first Telugu talkie Bhakta Prahlada, was directed by H. M. Reddy for Bharat Movietone.

Madan Theatres Ltd, who had lost out in the race to produce the first talkie in India with Shirin Farhad which followed two months later, produced 8 Talkies from Calcutta. Shirin Farhad was "twice as successful" compared to Alam Ara, and had 17 (out of the 18) songs sung by Jahanara Kajjan and Master Nissar.

A

B-C

D-F

G-L

M-Z

References

External links
Bollywood films of 1931 at the IMDb
Vintage Era Of Indian Cinema. Hindi Geet Kosh.
CITWF

1931
Bollywood
Films, Bollywood